Local elections are due to be held for South Ribble Borough Council on 4 May 2023. These will take place as part of the wider 2023 United Kingdom local elections. Every multi-member ward will be up for election.

Results

References

South Ribble
South Ribble Borough Council elections